Paul Frederick Ernst (November 7, 1899 – September 21, 1985) was an American pulp fiction writer.  He is best known as the writer of the original 24 "Avenger" novels, published by Street & Smith under the house name Kenneth Robeson.

Biography

Paul Ernst was born in Akron, Ohio. He "[took] up fiction writing in his early twenties".  "A prolific manufacturer of potboilers-made-to-order," his stories appeared in a number of early Science fiction and fantasy magazines. His writing appeared in Astounding Stories, Strange Tales and Amazing, and he was the author of the Doctor Satan series (8 stories in all) which ran in Weird Tales from 1935 to 1936. His most famous work was in writing the original 24 The Avenger stories in the eponymous pulp magazine between 1939 and 1942.

When pulp magazine work began to dry up, Ernst "was able to make a painless transition into the more prestigious "slick" magazines, where his word skill earned him higher financial rewards." As of 1971, he was "still active as a writer," including penning "Blackout" for the July 1971 issue of Good Housekeeping magazine. He died in Pinellas County, Florida in September 1985, at age 85.

Bibliography

Twelve Who Were Damned and Other Stories, Ramble House, 2016
The Complete Tales of Seekay, Steeger Books, 2018
Rulers of the Future, Armchair Fiction, 2019
Red Hell of Jupiter, Armchair Fiction, 2012

Critical studies and reviews
 Reviews The complete tales of Doctor Satan.

References

External links

 Paul Ernst at Internet Book List
 
 

American science fiction writers
Pulp fiction writers
1899 births
1985 deaths
20th-century American novelists
American male novelists
20th-century American male writers